Arturo Carvajal Acuña (March 25, 1909 – August 5, 1980) was a Chilean politician. He was president of the Union of the Iris Office and Provincial Secretary of the Chile Central labor Trade union (CUT). He was an elected member of the Chamber of Deputies of Chile between 1965 and 1973.

Biography 
He was born in Sotaquí, Ovalle, on March 25, 1909. He died on August 5, 1980. Son of Salvador Carvajal and Delfina Acuña. Married to Elena González Pérez.

He worked as a miner since 1939, He worked at Chuquicamata mine, the largest open-pit copper mine in the world, located in the north of Chile. He studied at Antofagasta School, he did not finish the school and quitted at primary level, then he joined the Trade union organization and started his Political campaigns
.

Career 
In 1963 Acuña was elected Mayor of Iquique and in 1965, being a member of the Communist Party, he was elected as deputy by the departmental group of Arica, Iquique and Pisagua, Chile for four years (1965-1969) and re-elected in 1969. He belonged to the permanent commissions of interior minister, sports, public works and transportation.

He also participated in the Investigation Commission of the Steel Industry (1967-1968).

Acuña with many members of the Communist Party band together in an underground Resistance movement, He was being persecuted, detained a couple of times, in Villa Grimaldi that were used for the interrogation  and torture of political prisoners during the governance of Augusto Pinochet. He died in August 1980.

Bibliography

 Biographies of Chileans Members of the Executive, Legislative and Judicial Powers 1876-1973; Armando de Ramón Folch; Editions Pontifical Catholic University of Chile, Santiago of Chile, Chile, 1999; volume 1.

References

External links 
 Library of Congress of Chile
 https://www.bcn.cl/historiapolitica/resenas_parlamentarias/wiki/Arturo_Carvajal_Acu%c3%b1a

1909 births
1980 deaths
People from Ovalle
Chilean people of Spanish descent
Communist Party of Chile politicians
Deputies of the XLV Legislative Period of the National Congress of Chile
Deputies of the XLVI Legislative Period of the National Congress of Chile
Chilean torture victims